Profit and Loss or profit and loss may refer to:

 Profit and loss statement, a statement that indicates how net revenue is transformed into net income

Media
 Profit & Loss, a business magazine
 "Profit and Loss" (Star Trek: Deep Space Nine), an episode of the television series
 Profit and the Loss, a British silent film

See also
 Net income
 Profit (disambiguation)
 Loss (disambiguation)